Enzo Nicolás Pérez (born 22 February 1986) is an Argentine professional footballer who plays as a central midfielder for River Plate and the Argentina national team.

He played four years for S.L. Benfica in Portugal, where he won five trophies, most notably the domestic treble in the 2013–14 season, and reached two consecutive UEFA Europa League finals.

Club career

Early career
Born in Maipú, Mendoza, Pérez began his career in Deportivo Maipú, like his father, and started his professional playing career with Godoy Cruz, where he wrote his name into club history by scoring a fifth-minute goal in the 1–1 draw with Belgrano on 9 September 2006. This was the first goal ever scored by Godoy Cruz in the Argentine first division. In total, he scored 12 goals in his career at Godoy Cruz, most coming from penalties. In 2007, Pérez joined Estudiantes de La Plata, where he finished as runner-up with the team in the 2008 Copa Sudamericana. He was then a first team regular in the team that won the 2009 Copa Libertadores.

Benfica
On 8 June 2011, Pérez signed a five-year contract with Portuguese club Benfica for a fee rumored to be around €5.5 million for his full rights from Estudiantes. After a serious knee injury sustained in the Champions League qualifiers, Pérez was loaned back to Estudiantes for six months on 9 February 2012.

On 27 July 2012, at the Eusébio Cup, Pérez scored a long-range goal against Real Madrid from a tight angle to complete a 5–2 win.

In the 2012–13 season, Pérez was successfully converted into a central midfielder, partnering with Nemanja Matić, assuming a central role in the team.

In the 2013–14 season, his influence was further increased after the departure of Matić to Chelsea on 15 January 2014, becoming a vital piece in Benfica's domestic treble (Primeira Liga, Taça de Portugal and Taça da Liga) and their second consecutive Europa League Final. Pérez, however, was not present in the eventual loss on penalties (4–2) to Sevilla in the final, having picked up a suspension in the semi-final against Juventus on 1 May 2014. His performances attracted attention from other clubs, while Benfica manager Jorge Jesus named Pérez his side's most difficult player to replace and the "brain" of the team. On 6 July 2014, Pérez won the Player of the Year award.

At the beginning of the 2014–15 season, Pérez won the Supertaça Cândido de Oliveira, thus winning all four Portuguese titles with Benfica in the 2014 calendar year.

Valencia
On 2 January 2015, Spanish La Liga club Valencia CF signed Pérez for a transfer fee of €25 million, the tenth-highest ever fee for an Argentine player. On 4 January, he debuted for Valencia in a home win over Real Madrid (2–1) in La Liga.

River Plate
On 29 June 2017, Pérez returned to Argentina and signed for River Plate.

Ahead of a Copa Libertadores match on 19 May 2021, River Plate announced that over twenty players, including all four rostered goalkeepers, would miss the match due to a COVID-19 outbreak within the squad. With no substitutes, Pérez appeared in goal, playing the entirety of the match against Colombian side Independiente Santa Fe in which River Plate won 2–1. Pérez made a number of key saves and was awarded with the man of the match for his performance.

International career
Pérez made his Argentina senior squad debut on 30 September 2009 under then-manager Diego Maradona in a friendly match against Ghana, an eventual 2–0 victory for the Albicelestes.

On 2 June 2014, Pérez was called up for the 2014 FIFA World Cup by manager Alejandro Sabella. After midfielder Ángel Di María sustained an injury in the quarter-finals, Pérez started in his placed in both the semi-final and final against Germany, which Argentina lost 1–0 after extra time.

In May 2018, Pérez was named in Argentina's preliminary squad for the 2018 FIFA World Cup, but did not make the final list. However, on 9 June 2018, he was called up as a replacement for the injured Manuel Lanzini.

Career statistics

Club

International

Scores and results list Argentina's goal tally first, score column indicates score after Pérez goal.

Honours
Godoy Cruz
Primera B Nacional: 2005–06

Estudiantes
Copa Libertadores: 2009
Argentine Primera División: 2010 Apertura
FIFA Club World Cup runner-up: 2009
Recopa Sudamericana runner-up: 2010

Benfica
Primeira Liga: 2013–14, 2014–15
Taça de Portugal: 2013–14
Taça da Liga: 2013–14
Supertaça Cândido de Oliveira: 2014
UEFA Europa League runner-up: 2012–13, 2013–14

River Plate
Copa Argentina: 2017, 2019
Supercopa Argentina: 2017, 2019
Copa Libertadores: 2018
Recopa Sudamericana: 2019
Argentine Primera División: 2021
Trofeo de Campeones de la Liga Profesional: 2021 

Argentina
FIFA World Cup runner-up: 2014
Superclásico de las Américas runner-up: 2014

Individual
O Jogo Team of the Year: 2013
Primeira Liga Player of the Year: 2013–14

References

External links

1986 births
Living people
Argentine footballers
Argentine expatriate footballers
Argentina international footballers
Association football midfielders
Godoy Cruz Antonio Tomba footballers
Estudiantes de La Plata footballers
S.L. Benfica footballers
Valencia CF players
Club Atlético River Plate footballers
Argentine Primera División players
Primeira Liga players
La Liga players
Expatriate footballers in Portugal
Expatriate footballers in Spain
Argentine expatriate sportspeople in Portugal
Argentine expatriate sportspeople in Spain
2014 FIFA World Cup players
2018 FIFA World Cup players
Sportspeople from Mendoza Province
People from Maipú, Argentina
Outfield association footballers who played in goal